Issac Ramoun Booth (born May 23, 1971) is a former American professional football player who played three seasons in the National Football League with the Cleveland Browns and Baltimore Ravens. Booth was drafted by the Browns in the fifth round of the 1994 NFL Draft and played cornerback for the Browns for the 1994 and 1995 seasons, earning one start in each of his first two seasons. After the 1995 season the original Cleveland Browns relocated to Baltimore, Maryland and became the Baltimore Ravens. Booth played his final season with the Ravens playing in 11 games and earning a career high three starts. Booth retired from football after the 1996 season. During his brief career, Booth played in 36 games, earning five starts, 55 tackles, two interceptions and one forced fumble.

1971 births
American football defensive backs
Baltimore Ravens players
Cleveland Browns players
Living people
California Golden Bears football players
Sacramento City Panthers football players
Players of American football from Indianapolis